Greifenberg Castle is a ruined castle in the municipality of Bäretswil and the canton of Zürich in Switzerland.  It is a Swiss heritage site of national significance.

See also
 List of castles in Switzerland

References

Cultural property of national significance in the canton of Zürich
Castles in the canton of Zürich
Ruined castles in Switzerland